The 1995 Tyson Holly Farms 400 was the 27th stock car race of the 1995 NASCAR Winston Cup Series and the 46th iteration of the event. The race was held on Sunday, October 1, 1995, in North Wilkesboro, North Carolina at the North Wilkesboro Speedway, a  oval short track. The race took the scheduled 400 laps to complete. At race's end, Roush Racing driver Mark Martin would manage to dominate the late stages of the race to take his 17th career NASCAR Winston Cup Series victory and his third victory of the season. To fill out the top three, Penske Racing South driver Rusty Wallace and Hendrick Motorsports driver Jeff Gordon would finish second and third, respectively.

After a 36-race absence, the race marked the NASCAR Winston Cup Series return for Ernie Irvan, who had suffered major head and lung injuries in a practice session at the 1994 GM Goodwrench Dealer 400. Irvan would finish sixth in the race.

Background 

North Wilkesboro Speedway is a short oval racetrack located on U.S. Route 421, about five miles east of the town of North Wilkesboro, North Carolina, or 80 miles north of Charlotte. It measures  and features a unique uphill backstretch and downhill frontstretch. It has previously held races in NASCAR's top three series, including 93 Winston Cup Series races. The track, a NASCAR original, operated from 1949, NASCAR's inception, until the track's original closure in 1996. The speedway briefly reopened in 2010 and hosted several stock car series races before closing again in the spring of 2011. It was re-opened in August 2022 for grassroots racing.

Entry list 

 (R) denotes rookie driver.

Qualifying 
Qualifying was split into two rounds. The first round was held on Friday, September 29, at 3:00 PM EST. Each driver would have one lap to set a time. During the first round, the top 25 drivers in the round would be guaranteed a starting spot in the race. If a driver was not able to guarantee a spot in the first round, they had the option to scrub their time from the first round and try and run a faster lap time in a second round qualifying run, held on Saturday, September 30, at 12:00 PM EST. As with the first round, each driver would have one lap to set a time. For this specific race, positions 26-32 would be decided on time, and depending on who needed it, a select amount of positions were given to cars who had not otherwise qualified but were high enough in owner's points; which was usually four. If needed, a past champion who did not qualify on either time or provisionals could use a champion's provisional, adding one more spot to the field.

Seven drivers would fail to qualify.

Full qualifying results

Race results

References 

1995 NASCAR Winston Cup Series
NASCAR races at North Wilkesboro Speedway
October 1995 sports events in the United States
1995 in sports in North Carolina